Tarutino is a rural locality (a selo) in Zhukovsky District of Kaluga Oblast, Russia, located on the Nara River  from Maloyaroslavets. It has a population of 733.

The 1812 Battle of Tarutino in Napoleon's invasion of Russia took place eight kilometers from the village.

References

Rural localities in Kaluga Oblast
Borovsky Uyezd